Bob Gomel (born August 14, 1933) is an American photojournalist who created images of 1960s world leaders, athletes, entertainers, and major events. His photographs have appeared on the covers of Life, Sports Illustrated, Newsweek, Fortune, and Forbes, and in Time, The New York Times, and Stern, and in more than 40 books. Gomel's images remain of interest to collectors, news organizations, authors and historians, and galleries and museums, including the U.S. Library of Congress and the Museum of Fine Arts in Houston.

Early life, education and family
Born in New York, Gomel earned a journalism degree from New York University in 1955 and then served as a U.S. naval aviator stationed in Japan from 1955 to 1958.

The father of three sons, Gomel resides in Houston with his wife, Sandra.

Life years 

As a Life magazine photographer from January 1959 through June 1969, Gomel's coverage included John F. Kennedy, the Beatles, and Cassius Clay, later known as Muhammad Ali, and Arnold Palmer. Gomel's major-event coverage included the 1962 Cuban Missile Crisis, the 1963 March on Washington, the 1963 funeral of President Kennedy, the 1964 Democratic National Convention, the 1965 Northeast blackout, the 1968 funeral of Sen. Robert Kennedy, the 1968 Democratic National Convention, the 1968 Republican National Convention, the 1969 funeral of President Dwight D. Eisenhower, United Nations debates, and the baseball World Series. In 1964, the University of Missouri School of Journalism honored Gomel with the best news photo of the year. The photo reflected the passion in the keynote speech of Sen. John O. Pastore at the 1964 Democratic National Convention. Life ran a full-page ad in the New York Times recognizing the award and others won by Life staff photographers.

Gomel's 1965 photograph of the blackout-darkened New York City skyline in moonlight is believed to be the first double-exposure image published as a news photograph. In 1966, editors selected Gomel's "Kayaker in White Water" for inclusion in Life Best of Year issue. In 1967, Gomel's Life photo essay on strip-mining in Appalachia helped lead to regulatory reform. Gomel's 1969 Life cover shot of President Eisenhower lying in state was the first news photograph taken from the dome of the U.S. Capitol Rotunda.  His camera was fired remotely by wire to a foot switch hundreds of feet below the dome. Gomel has said that his personal favorites among his own photographs include a child crying tears of joy as the nuclear submarine USS Triton and her sailor father return to their home base in Connecticut (1960). Other favorites are Malcolm X photographing Cassius Clay after his defeat of Sonny Liston in Miami (1964)  and a photo of Richard Nixon with his dogs Vickie and Checkers (1964).

After Life

From the 1970s through the 1990s, Gomel shifted his focus to commercial photography, and he moved to Houston in 1977. He shot national advertising campaigns throughout the world for Audi, Bulova, GTE, Merrill Lynch ("Bullish on America"), Pan Am Airways, Pennzoil, Shell Oil, the U.S. Army, and Volkswagen, and professional services companies, such as law firms and medical practices, among others.

In 2010, Gomel's photograph, "Malcolm X Photographing Muhammad Ali", was acquired by the Library of Congress.

In 2011, the NYU alumni magazine featured Gomel in "A Thousand Words". In 2011, Time included a Gomel photograph of John F. Kennedy touring a model of the Apollo space capsule in Houston in "High Point: President Kennedy Commits the U.S. to Landing on the Moon".

In 2012, National Geographic included Gomel's photograph of the 1965 blackout in "World's Worst Power Outages". In 2012, the Houston Chronicle featured Gomel in "50 years ago a promise made, a promise kept: going to the moon", marking the 50th anniversary of President Kennedy's "moon shot" speech at Rice University in Houston. Houston Public Media / KUHF-88.7 FM featured Gomel's unpublished photos of the Kennedy Speech in "Unpublished JFK Photos".

In 2013, Gomel was featured in a report  by KHOU-CBS 11 (Houston) commemorating the 50th anniversary of the assassination of President Kennedy.  In 2015, Time magazine featured Gomel's images of the Beatles in a report on the 50th anniversary of the band's arrival in the United States. CBS News reported on Gomel's unpublished photos of the Beatles' U.S. "invasion".  Gomel was featured in a report by KHOU-CBS 11 (Houston) commemorating the 50th anniversary of the Beatles' U.S. tour.

In 2014, Time included a Gomel photograph in "Death From Above: Airliners Collide Above New York City, December 1960".

In 2015, Gomel reflected on his long career in a Houston Chronicle report, "Renowned photographer Bob Gomel captured 1960s from a catbird seat". In 2015, USA Today referenced Gomel's Beatles in photography in "35 Years After John Lennon's Death, Revisit 35 Classic Photos", In 2015, the Houston Chronicle included Gomel's photo of Gemini astronauts Ed White and James McDivitt in "How Houston Lived 50 Years Ago". In 2015, BBC News included a Gomel photo of Muhammad Ali in "Should Sport and Politics Ever Mix?" In 2015, The Guardian (UK) included a Gomel photo of Muhammad Ali and Malcolm X in "Malcolm X was killed a half century ago, but his work lives on in us today".

In 2016, the Houston Chronicle included a Gomel photo of President Kennedy's moon speech at Rice University as one of "Houston's proudest moments".

In 2016, Gomel agreed to donate his photography archives to the University of Texas Dolph Briscoe Center for American History. In recent years, Gomel's international travel photography has been the subject of gallery shows and educational programs by the World Affairs Council of Houston, the Houston Center for Photography, the Houston chapter of the American Society of Media Photographers, the Monroe Gallery in Santa Fe, N.M., Houston FotoFest, and the Time-Life alumni organization.

In 2016, The Buzz Magazines in Houston featured Gomel in a profile. Also in 2016, KPRC-NBC 2 (Houston) featured a retrospective of Gomel's work. And in 2016 Gomel's image of JFK's casket beneath the U.S. Capitol Rotunda was included among "30 Powerful Pictures That Defined American History" in a collection of Life magazine images curated by Getty Images.

Book references

The Fight, Norman Mailer (1975 and 2013, Random House)
The Civil Rights Movement: A Photographic History, Steven Kasher (1996, Abbeville)
Life Sixty Years: A 60th Anniversary Celebration, (1996, Time-Life)
Life Goes to the Movies, David Edward Scherman (1975, Time-Life)
Art Buchwald: Leaving Home, a Memoir, (1994, Putnam Adult)
The Beatles: From Yesterday to Today, Charles Hirshberg (1996, Bullfinch Press Time Life)
Life: Century of Change: America in Pictures, Richard B. Stolley (2000, Time-Life)
Mafia, The Editors of Time-Life Books, (2003, Time-Life)
Arnold Palmer: A Personal Journey, Thomas Houser (2004, Harper Collins)
These Guys are Good: They Live to Play, They Play to Win: the Spirit and Drama of the PGA TOUR, (2005, Tehabi Sports)
Building New York: The Rise and Rise of the Greatest City on Earth, Bruce Marshall (2005, Universe)
Memories of John Lennon, Edited by Yoko Ono (2005, Harper Collins)
The Art of Caring: A Look at Life Through Photography, Cynthia Goodman (2009, Ruder-Finn)
2010–2011 Rules of Golf, United States Golf Association (2009)
Moonfire, The Epic Journey of Apollo 11, Norman Mailer (2010, Taschen)
Life 75 Years: The Very Best of Life, (2011, Time-Life)
Life Books: The Day Kennedy Died, (2013, Time-Life)
Five Days in November, Clint Hill and Lisa McCubbin (2013, Gallery, a Division of Simon & Schuster)
JFK: Superman Comes to the Supermarket, Norman Mailer and Nina Weiner (2014, Taschen America)
The 1960s: The Decade When Everything Changed, (2014, Time-Life)
Life Books: Lincoln: An Intimate Portrait, The Editors of Life (2014, Time-Life)
Blood Brothers: The Fatal Friendship Between Muhammad Ali and Malcolm X, (2016, Basic)

References

External links
University of Texas Dolph Briscoe Center for American History

American photojournalists
1933 births
New York University alumni
Living people